Edward Vason Jones (August 3, 1909 – October 1, 1980), a neoclassical architect and member of the Georgia School of Classicism, began his career in 1936 with the design and construction of the Gillionville Plantation near his hometown of Albany, Georgia. The project impressed Hal Hentz of the well-known Atlanta firm of Hentz, Reid, and Adler so much that he hired Vason Jones as draftsman and superintendent of construction, despite his lack of formal training in architecture. 	

In 1948, after a brief period spent designing warships for the U.S. Navy in Savannah, he established his own practice in Albany, where he worked until his death in 1980 .

His works include the first renovations to the U.S. Department of State's Diplomatic Reception Rooms from 1965 to 1980, renovations to the White House during the Richard Nixon, Gerald Ford and Jimmy Carter administrations,  work at the Mississippi Governor's Mansion, and dozens of neoclassical residential projects. A summer 2007 refurbishment of the Green Room at the White House retained his drapery and cornice design.

One of the reception rooms he designed at the State Department was named the "Edward Vason Jones Memorial Hall" in his honor.

Principal Architectural Works
 Hanson Residence, Birmingham, Alabama (completed 1967).

References

External links
State Department Diplomatic Reception Rooms

American neoclassical architects
People from Albany, Georgia
1980 deaths
1909 births
20th-century American architects